The United Nations Association Film Festival (UNAFF) is an international documentary film festival. It was founded by Jasmina Bojic, a Stanford educator and film critic, in 1998 to honor the 50th anniversary of the Universal Declaration of Human Rights. The festival showcases documentaries related to human rights and social issues/solutions and holds discussion forums with experts on the topics. 

The festival takes place annually in October in Palo Alto, East Palo Alto, San Francisco, and at Stanford University, spanning about 11 days.

History 

UNAFF was founded in 1998 by Jasmina Bojic, a lecturer at Stanford University in International Relations and winner of the UNESCO Fellini Medal in 2014 for her contribution in promotion of Universal Declaration of Human Rights through documentary films.  

While the festival supports the goal of United Nations, it is an independent project of UNA-USA and is an independent entity both financially and in governance. 

The festival has continuously been taking place since 1998 and has become one of the oldest solely documentary film festivals in the United States.

In 2020, the festival took place online for the first time due to COVID-19 circumstances.

The theme of the 2022 UNAFF is "Reflections," and its dates are October 20-30, 2022.

Festival and selection 
Every year, the festival has a theme which emphasizes a particular topic. These have included Education, Globalization, Health, Environment, Sustainability, Refugees, War, and Peace. The film submission process begins in January, and the selection process takes place during June each year. The selection process is quite competitive (for the year 2020, there were only 60 films selected out of the 600 submitted and reviewed by the jury). UNAFF has screened films which later won major awards (8 Academy Award winners and 30 Academy Award-nominated documentaries). There are round panel discussions with prominent experts, filmmakers, and community members to discuss challenging issues and solutions.

Awards 
UNAFF is a juried film festival whose entries are viewed and selected by a dedicated group of jurors coming from various walks of life, age groups, and backgrounds – from film experts and academics to community members, students, and interested professionals – who review and discuss the submitted films and decide which ones will be screened in October.

There are 6 primary awards:

 UNAFF Grand Jury Award for Best Documentary
 UNAFF Grand Jury Award for Best Short Documentary
 UNAFF Youth Vision Award
 UNAFF Award for Cinematography
 UNAFF Award for Editing
 UNAFF Visionary Award

Year-round programs 
There are multiple year-round programs organized to extend the impact of the festival's selected films.

UNAFF Traveling Film Festival 
Since 2000, the traveling festival takes place year-round in collaboration with UNA-USA chapters, universities, other film festivals, and community organizations across the US and abroad. The films are chosen from the films screened in the annual festival. So far it has taken place in
Bellevue, Berkeley, Boston, Burlington, Cambridge, Chapel Hill, Chicago, Davis, Denver,
Durham, Fryeburg, Honolulu, Houston, La Crosse, Las Vegas, Los Angeles, Miami, Monterey,
New Haven, New York, Philadelphia, Salt Lake City, San Diego, Santa Cruz, Saratoga,
Sebastopol, Sonoma, Washington D.C., Waukesha, and internationally in Abu Dhabi, Belgrade,
Kranjska Gora, Paris, Phnom Penh, and Venice.

UNAFF in Schools 
This series showcases documentary films related to teens (targeted to middle/high school students), followed by open discussion with film makers. It started in 2005.

UNAFF for Seniors 
This series shows documentary films relevant to seniors members of the society. It started in 2007.

UNAFF and Kids 
This series age appropriate documentary films (targeted for age 7-12) and teach children through hands on activity about the world around us.

UNAFF Café 
This series documentary films and conducts discussion at various venues/occasion in the community. It started in 2010

UNAFF with Veterans 
This series brings documentary films to veterans and their families. It started in 2014.

UNAFF Women's Salon 
This series started in 2015 to Encourage Women for active discussion in a supportive environment

UNAFF in Libraries 
This program brings together documentary films and the love of literature

UNAFF Archive 
This program offers research material for students of film, politics and international relations

Camera as Witness 
A collaboration of UNAFF and Stanford Arts, this series is conducted at Stanford University, where documentaries are presented to students/community members throughout the year.

Associations 
The Honorary Committee members include businessman Ted Turner and William Henry Draper III, Hollywood producer Gale Anne Hurd, Academy Award winner
Barbara Trent, Academy Award Nominee Erika Szanto, and various film and music stars known for involvement in human rights. These include Alec Baldwin, Peter Coyote, Lolita Davidovich, Danny Glover, 
Daryl Hannah, Susan Sarandon, John Savage, and Zucchero.

References

External links 
 

Documentary film festivals